Jeremy Page (born 6 September 1959) was an English cricketer. He was a left-handed batsman who played for Bedfordshire. He was born in Luton, Bedfordshire.

Page, who represented Bedfordshire in the Minor Counties Championship between 1995 and 2003, made a single List A appearance for the team, in the 2000 NatWest Trophy, against Northumberland. From the opening order, he scored 61 runs, the highest score of any Bedfordshire player in the match.

References

1959 births
Living people
English cricketers
Bedfordshire cricketers
Cricketers from Luton